Hasse is both a surname and a given name. Notable people with the name include:

Surname:
 Clara H. Hasse (1880–1926), American botanist
 Helmut Hasse (1898–1979), German mathematician
 Henry Hasse (1913–1977), US writer of science fiction
 Johann Adolph Hasse (1699–1783), German composer
 Maria Hasse (1921–2014), German mathematician
 Peter Hasse (c. 1585–1640), German organist and composer

Given name or nickname:
 Hans Alfredson (born 1931), Swedish actor, film director, writer and comedian
 Hans Backe (born 1952), Swedish football manager
 Hasse Borg (born 1953), Swedish footballer
 Hasse Börjes (born 1948), Swedish speed skater
 Hasse Ekman (1915-2004), Swedish film director and actor
 Hans Wind (1919–1995), Finnish flying ace

See also
 Hasse bound, on the number of points on an elliptic curve
 Hasse diagram, a diagram used in set theory